Raymond Harrison (4 August 1929 – 2000) was a British fencer. He won a silver medal in the team épée event at the 1960 Summer Olympics.

References

External links
 

1929 births
2000 deaths
British male fencers
Olympic fencers of Great Britain
Fencers at the 1952 Summer Olympics
Fencers at the 1960 Summer Olympics
Olympic silver medallists for Great Britain
Olympic medalists in fencing
Medalists at the 1960 Summer Olympics
English Olympic medallists
20th-century British people